Ross Leslie Alan Hunter (born 27 January 1981 in Frimley, Surrey) is a former English cricketer. Hunter was a right-handed batsman who played primarily as a wicketkeeper and represented England at Under 15 and 17 level.

Hunter played a single List-A match for the Hampshire Cricket Board in the 2000 NatWest Trophy against Huntingdonshire. Hunter scored 33 runs and completed one stumping.

Hunter played three Second Eleven Championship matches in 2001 for the Derbyshire Second XI and Second Eleven Friendly matches for Hampshire County Cricket Club prior to that.

Hunter became a professional cricket coach and Head Coach of the England Visually Impaired Cricket Team. He is now using this experience of coaching and elite environments in businesses and organisations.

External links
Ross Hunter at Cricinfo
Ross Hunter at CricketArchive

1981 births
Living people
Cricketers from Frimley
English cricketers
Hampshire Cricket Board cricketers